Blankenheim is a municipality in the district of Euskirchen in the state of North Rhine-Westphalia, Germany.

Geography

The river Ahr has its source in the centre of Blankenheim, in the cellar of a half timbered house.

History

In the year 721, Blankenheim is mentioned for the first time as "Blancio" in a document. Today, the municipality is called in Eifel dialect as "Blangem" and has got a long carnival tradition.

See also
 Blankenheim Castle

References

External links

Official website 
Tourist info
Eifel Museum Blankenheim 

Euskirchen (district)